Virginia Rudd Lanier ( - ) was an American mystery fiction writer, author of a series featuring bloodhound trainer Jo Beth Sidden.

Biography
Lanier was born in Madison County, Florida in 1930. She was an orphan and was adopted by Ira and Mary Holt Rudd.

Death
Lanier died in her home in October 2003 after a long illness.

Bibliography
Lanier published her first book in 1995 at age 65 after having thrown a book across the room in disgust and attempting to write something better herself.

Novels
Death in Bloodhound Red (1995)
The House on Bloodhound Lane (1996)
A Brace of Bloodhounds (1997)
Blind Bloodhound Justice (1998)
Ten Little Bloodhounds (1998)
A Bloodhound to Die For (2003)

Short stories
"Bark M for Murder" (2006) (with J. A. Jance, Lee Charles Kelley and Chassie West)

Awards
Lanier's début novel Death in Bloodhound Red won the 1996 Anthony Award for "Best First Novel" and was also nominated for the same honour at the Agatha Awards the previous year. Her fourth novel, Blind Bloodhound Justice, was nominated for the 1998 Agatha Award in the "Best Novel" category. Lanier's last novel, A Bloodhound to Die For, was nominated for the Mary Higgins Clark Award at the 2004 Edgar Awards.

Adaptations
As of 1998, the Jo Beth Sidden series was optioned to be the basis for a Hollywood movie or a TV Mini-series. However, this project appears to have been scrapped.

See also
Mystery (fiction)
List of female detective/mystery writers
List of female detective characters

References

20th-century American novelists
21st-century American novelists
American mystery writers
American women novelists
1930 births
2003 deaths
Anthony Award winners
Women mystery writers
20th-century American women writers
21st-century American women writers